Sânzieni is a commune in Covasna County, Transylvania, Romania composed of four villages:
Cașinu Mic / Kiskászon
Petriceni / Kézdikővár
Sânzieni / Kézdiszentlélek
Valea Seacă / Kézdiszárazpatak

History 
Sânzieni formed part of the Székely Land region of the historical Transylvania province. Until 1918, the village belonged to the Háromszék County of the Kingdom of Hungary. After the Treaty of Trianon of 1920, it became part of Romania.

Demographics
The commune has an absolute Székely Hungarian majority. According to the 2011 census, it has a population of 4,563, of which 99.17% or 4,525 are Hungarian.

International relations

Sânzieni is twinned with Újbuda, Budapest, Hungary.

References

Communes in Covasna County
Localities in Transylvania